The 2009 Australian Short Course Swimming Championships were held at the Hobart Aquatic Centre from Saturday 8 August to Wednesday 12 August. They were organised by Swimming Australia and sponsored by Telstra.

The events were spread over five days of competition featuring heats in the morning, with semi-finals and finals in the evening session. The format of the meet consisted of heats for all individual events with semi-finals in the 50 and 100 m individual events. The 200 and 400 m events consisted of A and B finals with no semi-finals whilst the 800 and 1500 m freestyle and relay events consisted of timed finals only.

Medal winners

Men's events

Legend:

Women's events

Legend:

Points table

Full points listing:

See also
2009 in swimming
2009 Australian Swimming Championships

References

External links
2009 Telstra Australian Short Course Championships

Swim
Australian Short Course Swimming Championships
Australian Short Course Swimming Championships, 2009
Sport in Hobart
Sports competitions in Tasmania